Yaubulyakovo (Yawbüläk) is a rural locality (a village) in Arkaulovsky Selsoviet, Salavatsky District, Bashkortostan, Russia. The population was 26 as of 2010. There is 1 street.

Geography 
Yaubulyakovo is located 31 km north of Maloyaz (the district's administrative centre) by road. Beshevlyarovo is the nearest rural locality.

References 

Rural localities in Salavatsky District